Ian Paul Joy (born July 14, 1981) is an American born Scottish sports broadcaster and former professional footballer.

Early and personal life
Born in San Diego, California, Joy is the son of English former professional player Brian Joy. His mother is Scottish and he grew up in Scotland from the age of 3. Joy lived in Bo'ness and attended Deanburn Primary School and Bo'ness Academy. Joy is a fan of Manchester United F.C.

Playing career
Joy played as a left back for Tranmere Rovers, Stirling Albion, Montrose, Kidderminster Harriers, Chester City, Hamburger SV IIi, FC St. Pauli, Real Salt Lake, FC Ingolstadt 04 and Portland Timbers.

As a 15 year-old, he featured for the United States U-17 team on a three-match week long tour of Germany in 1997. Joy went on to represent the USA Youth national teams at U-18, U-20 and U-23 level. He captained the USA U-18's at the World Youth Games in Moscow, Russia in 1998.

Media
After retiring as a player in 2011, Joy became a sportscaster for beIN Sports.  In 2015 he became the studio host of Fox Sports' coverage of the Bundesliga, FA Cup, Champions League and Europa League. In April 2018, Joy was named as a studio host for FOX's coverage of the 2018 FIFA World Cup.

On March 25, 2020, Joy announced on Twitter he would be leaving Fox Sports. 

Joy is a part of the YES Network covering New York sports after joining the network in 2015.

As of August 5, 2020, Joy serves as a soccer analyst for CBS Sports as part of the network's UEFA Champions League and Europa League coverage on CBS Sports HQ.

References

1981 births
Living people
2. Bundesliga players
3. Liga players
American expatriate soccer players
American expatriate sportspeople in England
American expatriate soccer players in Germany
American expatriate sportspeople in Scotland
American people of English descent
American people of Scottish descent
American soccer players
Association football fullbacks
Chester City F.C. players
English Football League players
Expatriate footballers in England
Expatriate footballers in Scotland
FC Ingolstadt 04 players
FC St. Pauli players
Hamburger SV II players
Kidderminster Harriers F.C. players
Major League Soccer players
Montrose F.C. players
National League (English football) players
Portland Timbers (2001–2010) players
Real Salt Lake players
Scottish Football League players
Soccer players from San Diego
Stirling Albion F.C. players
Tranmere Rovers F.C. players
USSF Division 2 Professional League players